Sanni Vanhanen (born 1 July 2005) is a Finnish ice hockey player and member of the Finnish national ice hockey team, currently signed with HIFK Naiset of the Naisten Liiga (NSML) for the 2022–23 season. She was the youngest player to represent Finland in the 2021 IIHF Women's World Championship and was the youngest player to compete in the women's ice hockey tournament at the 2022 Winter Olympics.

Playing career
Vanhanen began playing ice hockey with the youth department of HC Nokia in her hometown of Nokia, in the Pirkanmaa region of southwestern Finland. As HC Nokia did not have a girls' ice hockey section, she played with HC Nokia's top boys' teams for her age. In the 2017–18 season, her last with HC Nokia, she played with the club's boys' teams in the under-12 (U12; E1) AAA league and the U13 (D2) AA and U13 (D2) AAA leagues (see minor ice hockey).

Like HC Nokia, Tappara did not have a girls' ice hockey section, and in her first season with the club, she played in the boys' D1 (U14) AAA with Tappara Musta ('Tappara Black') and also appeared in a few matches as a substitute with Tappara's other D1 AAA team, Tappara Sininen ('Tappara Blue'). In the D1 AAA preliminary series, she ranked sixth of all Tappara Musta players for scoring, with 10 points in 16 games, and tied for third in team assists, with 7. Facing new and more challenging opponents in the regular season, her scoring was limited to 2 goals and four assists for 6 points in 15 games.

During the 2021–22 season, she played in the U16 SM-sarja with the men's under-16 team of Tappara and on loan in the Naisten Liiga with the Tampereen Ilves Naiset.

International play
Vanhanen participated in the 2019 Women's U16 European Cup, winning silver with the Finnish team. She joined the Finnish national under-18 team in the 2019–20 season, playing in nineteen international matches in addition to competing at the 2020 IIHF World Women's U18 Championship, where Finland finished fourth.

Vanhanen's first invitation to a senior national team training camp was the roster selection camp for the World Championship in March 2021. National team head coach Pasi Mustonen described her as a player with "absolutely tremendous potential" and identified her adaptability as a key attribute that led to her selection.

Career statistics

Regular season and playoffs 

Sources:

International

References

External links 
 
 

Living people
2005 births
Finnish women's ice hockey forwards
HIFK Naiset players
Ilves Naiset players
Ice hockey players at the 2022 Winter Olympics
Medalists at the 2022 Winter Olympics
Olympic ice hockey players of Finland
Olympic bronze medalists for Finland
Olympic medalists in ice hockey
People from Nokia, Finland
Sportspeople from Pirkanmaa